The 2023 World Baseball Classic Pool A was the first of four pools of the 2023 World Baseball Classic that took place from March 8–12 at Taichung Stadium in Taichung, Taiwan. The top two teams automatically qualified for the top eight knockout stage, beginning with the quarterfinals in Tokyo and the remaining of the bracket in Miami. The teams in this pool consisted of hosts Chinese Taipei, Cuba, Italy, Netherlands, and Panama.

After all games were completed, the five teams tied at 2–2. This resulted in the standings being determined by the fewest runs allowed per defensive out recorded. Cuba won the pool and advanced to the quarterfinals, along with Italy as runners-up, and Chinese Taipei fell to last place and was relegated to the qualifiers for the 2026 World Baseball Classic, despite scoring the most in the pool.

Yu Chang of Chinese Taipei was named the most valuable player of Pool A.

Teams

Standings

Tiebreaker
As all five teams tied at 2–2, WBC's tiebreakers went into effect. The first tiebreaker, head-to-head record, was unnessary because all five teams were tied. The final standings were determined by the fewest runs allowed per defensive out recorded. Based on the calculation, Cuba won the pool, while Italy advanced as the runner-up.

Summary

|}

Matches

Cuba vs Netherlands

Panama vs Chinese Taipei

Panama vs Netherlands

Italy vs Cuba

Cuba vs Panama

Italy vs Chinese Taipei

Panama vs Italy

Netherlands vs Chinese Taipei

Chinese Taipei vs Cuba

Netherlands vs Italy

Statistics

Source:

Leading hitters

Power

Efficiency

Leading pitchers

References

Pool A
World Baseball Classic Pool A
International baseball competitions hosted by Taiwan
World Baseball Classic Pool A
Sport in Taichung